Radio Republik Indonesia (Radio of the Republic of Indonesia, abbreviated as RRI), legally Lembaga Penyiaran Publik (LPP) Radio Republik Indonesia (Public Broadcasting Institution Radio of the Republic of Indonesia), is a public radio network of Indonesia. Founded on 11 September 1945, it is the first radio network in Indonesia and the second oldest media company in the country after Antara. RRI headquarters are located on Medan Merdeka Barat Street in Central Jakarta.

RRI has four radio networks and a visual radio channel, broadcasts all over Indonesia to serve all citizens throughout the nation. The network is supported by roughly 90 local stations, the largest of any radio network in the country. Through its overseas broadcasting division Voice of Indonesia, RRI also provides information about Indonesia to people around the world. Its funding primarily comes from annual state budget approved by the parliament, advertisement, and other services.

History
RRI was established on 11 September 1945 by several figures who previously operated several Japanese radio stations in 6 cities. A meeting attended by the station delegates at Adang Kadarusman house on Menteng resulted in the decision to set up Radio Republik Indonesia by choosing Abdul Rahman Saleh as the first general manager.

In February 1946, RRI was placed under the Department of Information, and immediately became a tool for the newly established national government during Indonesian National Revolution.

Domestic Dutch-language broadcasts were discontinued in 1954.

The RRI central station in Jakarta became one of the vital objects captured by the 30 September Movement on 1 October 1965. In that morning, RRI reported about the September 30 Movement aimed at high-ranking officers who were members of the "Council of Generals" who were about to stage a coup against the government, and announced the formation of "Revolutionary Council" led by Lt. Col. Untung.

In late 1960s, private radio stations were established and effectively ended RRI's monopoly on radio broadcasting. However, during the New Order era, upon the requests of the Ministry of Information, RRI-produced news programs were aired simulcast on all radio stations.

After the Broadcasting Act No. 32/2002 is in force, RRI, along with TVRI, set as the public radio network in 2006 and became independent of any governmental control. The status then reaffirmed by Government Regulation (Peraturan Pemerintah) No. 12 of 2005.

In March 2020, during the COVID-19 pandemic in Indonesia, RRI use the tagline Radio Tanggap Bencana COVID-19 (COVID-19 Disaster Responsive Radio). By the tagline, the network announced their efforts to combat the pandemic by providing accurate and reliable information, and supporting the actions of government of Indonesia during the pandemic.

A proposed new Broadcasting Act (Undang-Undang Penyiaran) currently in the making would merge RRI with its fellow public broadcaster TVRI unto a unified firm RTRI (Radio Televisi Republik Indonesia, Radio [and] Television of the Republic of Indonesia).

Principles and structure
RRI is designated as public broadcasting institution per Act No. 32 of 2002 on Broadcasting, which defined as a "legal entity established by the state; has independent, neutral, not commercial (characteristics); and has the function to provide services for the public benefit". Its duty, according to Government Regulation No. 12 of 2005, is "to provide the healthy information, education and entertainment services, (maintain) social control and unity, and preserve the nation's culture for the whole public benefit by organizing radio broadcast that reaches all parts of the Unitary State of the Republic of Indonesia". The network is formally placed directly under, and responsible to, the President of Indonesia.

Unlike other public broadcasters such as TVRI and newly established local public broadcasters, RRI has long had a broadcast pledge called Three Pledges of RRI (Tri Prasetya RRI), shown below in English:
 We must save all radio broadcast devices from anyone who wants to use these devices to destroy our country, and defend the devices with all our body and soul in any condition and with any consequences.
 We must drive the RRI broadcast as an instrument of struggle and revolutionary tool for the entire Indonesian nation, with a pure national spirit, a clean and honest heart, and a mind full of love and loyalty to the homeland and nation.
 We must stand above all traditions and beliefs of any parties or groups, by prioritizing national unity and the safety of the state and holding on the spirit of the Proclamation of 17 August 1945.

RRI organization structure consists of five Board of Supervisors (Dewan Pengawas) appointed by the People's Representative Council (DPR) and six Board of Directors (Dewan Direksi) appointed by the Board of Supervisors. Both are sworn in by the President, served for five years and renewable once.

According to article 15 of the Broadcasting Act, RRI funding comes from several sources such as broadcasting fees, annual state budget (drafted by the government and approved by the DPR), community contribution, and advertisement, as well as other legal efforts related to the broadcasting operation. In fact, as of today the broadcasting fee is not yet implemented, and RRI is asked to generate "non-tax revenue" for the state by various funding sources (besides the annual state budget), which some of the revenue would be returned to the network. Previously the radio tax to supplement RRI funding was charged in 1947, but was abolished sometime in the 1980s.

Services

Radio

In general, RRI offers a maximum of four main stations in a region (availability are vary, see below), one of them is a national simulcast. Three other services are transmitted locally, producing local programmes as well as relaying programmes from RRI central station in Jakarta.

 Pro 1 (regional radio, Channel of Inspiration): serves as "community empowerment centre" for rural, urban, mountainous and industrial community. Mainly broadcasts local news and education as well as music for 19 hours a day, from 5am to midnight local time.
 Pro 2 (music and entertainment radio, Voice of Creativity): serves as "youth creativity centre" for teenager urban contemporary community. Mainly broadcasts music, entertainment and lifestyle programming for 19 hours a day, from 5am to midnight local time.
 Pro 3 (news and talk radio, National News Network): relays directly from RRI central station, it broadcasts 24-hour news, current affairs, and talk programming nationally supplemented by reports from local RRI stations.
 Pro 4 (culture radio, Encyclopedia of Indonesian Culture): currently exist in several cities, it broadcasts variety of cultures within Indonesia as well as local culture programming for 19 hours a day, from 5am to midnight local time.

Major cities stations

Other local stations 
RRI Pro 1, RRI Pro 2, and RRI Pro 4 operates 19 hours every day, starting 5am to 12am local time. Availability of Pro 1, Pro 2, Pro 3, and Pro 4 as of November 2021 is displayed on the table below.

An RRI local station for Dili was operating from 1976 to 1999. East Timor national broadcaster RTTL currently takes place.

Television

RRI has its own visual radio channel, RRI NET, that broadcasts certain live national radio programming via television. RRI NET can be accessed via streaming service as well as free-to-air satellite television across the country.

RRI NET is known to have been first broadcasting since December 2015. However, the channel was only officially launched on 12 September 2018 in commemoration of RRI's 73rd anniversary.

The current slogan of RRI NET is "Tonton apa yang anda dengar" (Watch what you listen).

Online
RRI maintain a news portal on its official website (rri.co.id), as well as indie music portal BeYoung.id. The network also maintain RRIplay Go mobile app, offering RRI services in one app such as live streaming of all networks and local stations, news portal, RRI 30" citizen journalism and BeYoung.

Criticism and controversies

See also
 Voice of Indonesia, the RRI shortwave overseas service
 TVRI, the Indonesian public television network
 Antara, the Indonesian news agency
 Public broadcasting in Indonesia

References

Further reading 
 Djamalul Abidin As (ed.), 40 Tahun Radio Republik Indonesia: Sekali di Udara Tetap di Udara. Jakarta: Panitia Peringatan Hari Radio ke-40, 1985.

External links
 RRI Official site 

 
Indonesian radio networks
Radio stations established in 1945
Publicly funded broadcasters
Public broadcasting in Indonesia
1945 establishments in Indonesia
Mass media companies of Indonesia